24 Hour Fitness is a privately owned and operated fitness center chain headquartered in Carlsbad, California. It is the second largest fitness chain in the United States based on revenue after LA Fitness, and the fourth in number of clubs (behind LA Fitness, Anytime Fitness & Gold's Gym), operating 287 clubs across 11 U.S. states. The company was originally founded by Mark S. Mastrov and was sold to Forstmann Little & Co in 2005, and then to AEA investors and Ontario Teachers Pension Plan in 2014. After COVID-19 forced gym closures ravaged the fitness industry in 2020, the company filed for bankruptcy in June 2020, closed over 100 clubs and successfully emerged from bankruptcy under with new owners Sculptor Capital Investments LLC, Monarch Alternative Capital LP and Cyrus Capital Partners LP in December, 2020.

History

Early history and founding
24 Hour Fitness was founded in 1983 by Mark Mastrov. Mastrov had been using a local gym for rehab after a knee injury, and turned the gym into a 24-hour nautilus facility after buying out the owner. The company was originally named "24 Hour Nautilus", but merged with southern California based company "Family Fitness" in 1996, which resulted in both brands emerging as "24 Hour Fitness"

2004–2008: Olympics and other sponsorships
In 2004, 24 Hour Fitness became a sponsor of the 2004–2008 United States Olympic teams. The sponsorship grants memberships to some U.S. Olympic hopefuls, and includes upgrades to some U.S. Olympic Training Centers across the country, including renovation of the facility in Colorado Springs, Colorado, in 2004 to be followed by Lake Placid, New York, and Chula Vista, California.

24 Hour Fitness partnered with NBC to develop a reality show, The Biggest Loser, which features 12 to 22 overweight contestants competing to lose weight over several million dollars. The show first aired in late 2004.

Beginning in 2005, 24 Hour Fitness partnered with cyclist Lance Armstrong co-sponsored the Discovery Channel Pro Cycling Team. That same year, 24 Hour Fitness opened its first Lance Armstrong Signature Club. 24 Hour Fitness cut their ties with Armstrong in 2012 after his doping scandal.

2009–present: Acquisition and other operations
24 Hour Fitness formerly had some 15 clubs in Singapore and China. Besides the United States, it had centers in Singapore and Hong Kong, Beijing and Shanghai in China) through its wholly owned subsidiary California Fitness (CalFit). Its European clubs closed in the early 2000s. CalFit was sold to Ansa Group, a Hong Kong company in 2012; 24 Hour Fitness became an exclusively US gym chain.

Its former affiliate and spinoff California Wow Xperience (CalWowX), a California Fitness offshoot, formerly had member swap agreements with both 24 Hour, then only California Fitness, and at its height ran gyms located in Bangkok, Chiang Mai and Pattaya in Thailand, including one female-only club.

In August 2012, the owner of 24 Hour Fitness put the 416 location gym chain on the auction block with a price tag reported to have been close to $2 billion. After being courted by various interests for over six months, ultimately in January 2012, the board of directors took 24 Hour Fitness off the market. Offers reportedly fell short of the asking price.

In May 2014, Forstmann Little & Co. reportedly sold 24 Hour Fitness Worldwide Inc. for $1.85 billion to an investment group led by AEA Investors LP and the Ontario Teachers' Pension Plan.

In April 2020, due to the coronavirus gym closings, the company was exploring the option of filing for bankruptcy within the next few months.

In June 2020, the company officially declared bankruptcy and indicated plans to close over 130 gyms.

In December 2020, the company successfully emerged from bankruptcy.

Operations

As of 2022, 24 Hour Fitness operates nearly 300 clubs in 11 states, with more than 7,500 employees. Its major competitors in the US are Anytime Fitness, Gold's Gym and LA Fitness.

Criticisms

On July 31, 2007, 24 Hour Fitness settled a class-action lawsuit brought against it by 1.8 million current and former members. The plaintiffs claimed damages for the continuation of automatic withdrawals by 24 Hour Fitness long after their monthly memberships were canceled by request. In McCardle vs 24 Hour Fitness USA, Inc., the Alameda County Court ruled in favor of the plaintiffs of the class-action lawsuit. In 2010, the court found that 24 Hour Fitness did not act in good faith after denying members who purchased an "All Club" membership access to rebranded locations without charging additional fees not disclosed in the original contract.

Six former employees of 24 Hour Fitness filed a separate class-action lawsuit on July 13, 2010. This lawsuit was brought in the State of California pursuant to allegations that 24 Hour Fitness discriminated based on race and gender in their promotion practices. The claimants are either females, minorities, or both.

Ratings and reviews
, 805 complaints had been registered against 24 Hour Fitness with the Better Business Bureau (BBB) in the previous three years, 276 in the previous 12 months. 24 Hour Fitness has an A+ rating with the BBB.

References

Health care companies established in 1983
American companies established in 1983
Health clubs in the United States
Companies based in San Ramon, California
Private equity portfolio companies
Privately held companies based in California
1983 establishments in California
Medical and health organizations based in California
2014 mergers and acquisitions
Companies that filed for Chapter 11 bankruptcy in 2020